The 2014 La Manga Women Tournament is an exhibition international football (soccer) competition featuring football, which was held in February and March 2014. All matches were played in La Manga Stadium in La Manga Club, Spain.

Teams

Standings

Matches

References 

2014
2014 in Japanese women's football
2014 in American women's soccer
2014 in Swedish women's football
2014 in Norwegian women's football
2013–14 in English women's football
2013–14 in German women's football